Pirinem is a rural locality (a village) in Pinezhsky District, Arkhangelsk Oblast, Russia. The population was 399 as of 2012. There are 9 streets.

Geography 
Pirinem is located on the Pinega River, 42 km northwest of Karpogory (the district's administrative centre) by road. Cheshegora is the nearest rural locality.

References 

Rural localities in Pinezhsky District